The 1917 University of Utah football team was an American football team that represented the University of Utah as a member of the Rocky Mountain Conference (RMC) during the 1915 college football season. Led by Nelson Norgren in his fourth and final season as head coach, Utah compiled an overall record of 2–4 with a mark of 2–3 in conference play, tying for fourth place in the RMC.

Schedule

References

University of Utah
Utah Utes football seasons
University of Utah football